Vĩnh Tường is a rural district of Vĩnh Phúc province in the Red River Delta region of northern Vietnam. As of 2003, the district had a population of 189,970.

Geography 
The district covers an area of 142 km². The district capital lies at Vĩnh Tường. It borders Yên Lạc district (east), Lập Thạch district and Vĩnh Yên city (north), Việt Trì city of Phú Thọ Province (west), Ba Vì district of Hà Nội (west, separated by the Red River), Phúc Thọ district & Sơn Tây city of Hà Nội (south, separated by the Red River).

Vĩnh Tường includes 3 towns (thị trấn) and 26 communes (xã):

Towns 

 Vĩnh Tường (main town, administrative center)
 Thổ Tang (Trade Center)
 Tứ Trưng

Communes 

 Vĩnh Ninh
 Phú Đa
 Lũng Hoà
 Tân Cương
 Đại Đồng
 Cao Đại
 Tuân Chính
 Bồ Sao
 Vĩnh Sơn
 Bình Dương
 Vân Xuân
 Tam Phúc
 Phú Thịnh
 Lý Nhân
 An Tường
 Vĩnh Thịnh
 Yên Bình
 Tân Tiến
 Vũ Di
 Thượng Trưng
 Chấn Hưng
 Ngũ Kiên
 Kim Xá
 Yên Lập
 Việt Xuân
 Nghĩa Hưng

Economy 
The district's main occupation is agriculture. The main products are rice, maize and soya. The district hosts many craft villages, such as Bích Chu and Thủ Độ (carpentry), Lý Nhân (blacksmith), and Thổ Tang (wholesale trade).

Notables 

 Hồ Xuân Hương (poetess)
 Nguyễn Viết Xuân (artillery commander, revolutionary martyr)
 Lê Xoay (revolutionary martyr).

Culture 
Most residents have no religion, although ancestor worship is widespread. Traditional festivals are celebrated along with a regional festival. It includes 18 communes. 

The two main dishes are Chưng cake (square or cylinder glutinous rice green cake, filled with green bean paste and fat pork) and Dày cake (round sticky rice white cake). They are made from glutinous rice. Many expatriates visit their homeland.

References

External links 

 
 Vĩnh Phúc Portal

Districts of Vĩnh Phúc province